A normally hyperbolic invariant manifold (NHIM)  is a natural generalization of a hyperbolic fixed point and a hyperbolic set.  The difference can be described heuristically as follows:  For a manifold  to be normally hyperbolic we are allowed to assume that the dynamics of  itself is neutral compared with the dynamics nearby, which is not allowed for a hyperbolic set. NHIMs were introduced by Neil Fenichel in 1972.  In this and subsequent papers, Fenichel proves that NHIMs possess stable and unstable manifolds and more importantly, NHIMs and their stable and unstable manifolds persist under small perturbations.  Thus, in problems involving perturbation theory, invariant manifolds exist with certain hyperbolicity properties, which can in turn be used to obtain qualitative information about a dynamical system.

Definition
Let M be a compact smooth manifold, f: M → M a diffeomorphism, and Df: TM → TM the differential of f. Thus, there exist constants  and c > 0 such that

and

See also
 Stable manifold
 Center manifold
 Hyperbolic fixed point
 Hyperbolic set
 Hyperbolic Lagrangian coherent structures

References

 M.W. Hirsch, C.C Pugh, and M. Shub Invariant Manifolds, Springer-Verlag (1977),  

Dynamical systems